Bloodsucking Fiends: A Love Story is a novel by American writer Christopher Moore, published in 1995.  It combines elements of the supernatural and of the romance novel.

Plot summary
Jody, a young, single, red-headed woman living in San Francisco, is attacked by a vampire and soon finds that she has become one herself. While attempting to adjust to her new nocturnal lifestyle, she finds the help of Tommy Flood, a wannabe writer who recently moved to the city and works as a night stocking manager (and champion "turkey bowler") at a local Safeway. She has him perform tasks during the day as her vampirism forces her unconscious except after sundown. As Jody and Tommy begin their life together and begin falling in love, they discover that a recent string of mysterious murders may be the work of the vampire who attacked Jody. To get to the bottom of the matter, they recruit "the Animals", Tommy's crew of stockers from the supermarket, as well as an eccentric street person and his faithful dogs known as "The Emperor."

Bloodsucking Fiends is the first volume of a trilogy, followed by You Suck: A Love Story (2007) and Bite Me (2010).

External links
Author's webpage for Bloodsucking Fiends
Review by Tom Knapp

1995 American novels
American comedy novels
American romance novels
American vampire novels
Human-vampire romance in fiction
Novels by Christopher Moore
1995 fantasy novels
Novels set in San Francisco